Stammheim is a municipal part of Cologne, Germany and part of the district of Mülheim. Stammheim lies on the right bank of the river Rhine, between Mülheim (proper) and Flittard. The city part has 7.473 inhabitants (as of 31 December 2008) and covers an area of 3,75 km². 

Stammheim was first mentioned in 959; the former Stammheim palace (Schloss Stammheim) was purchased by the Fürstenberg family in 1818, but heavily damaged during the Bombing of Cologne in World War II and later worked away completely. Stammheim is served by the Köln-Stammheim station.

External links 
 official site 

Boroughs and quarters of Cologne
Mülheim, Cologne